Mark Dexter Hollis (September 24, 1908 – February 21, 1998) was the director of the Centers for Disease Control and Prevention from 1944 to 1946.

References

Directors of the Centers for Disease Control and Prevention
1908 births
1998 deaths
Franklin D. Roosevelt administration personnel
Truman administration personnel